Beckwith is an unincorporated community in Jefferson County, in the U.S. state of Iowa.

History
 Beckwith was founded on the Chicago, Burlington & Quincy Railroad (CB&Q). Beckwith's post office operated from 1877 to 1901. Beckwith had a one-room schoolhouse circa 1939.

The community's population was 50 in 1890, 65 in 1900, 50 in 1920, and 32 in 1940.

Beckwith lies on an Amtrak line, and in 2018 was one of four Iowa sites selected for an upgrade to a centralized traffic control crossover, as part of a federal grant.

References

Unincorporated communities in Jefferson County, Iowa
Unincorporated communities in Iowa